Patricia Koch (born 15 November 1990) is a Liechtensteiner footballer who plays as a midfielder for Neusiedl am See and the Liechtenstein national football team.

Career statistics

International

References

1990 births
Living people
Women's association football midfielders
Liechtenstein women's international footballers
Liechtenstein women's footballers
Liechtenstein expatriate women's footballers
Expatriate women's footballers in Austria